Geodia anceps is a species of sponge in the family Geodiidae. The species is found in the western part of the Mediterranean Sea and was first described by Gualtherus Carel Jacob Vosmaer in 1894 as Synops anceps.

References

Tetractinellida
Sponges described in 1894
Taxa named by Gualtherus Carel Jacob Vosmaer